Sankt Lorenzen bei Scheifling is a former municipality in the district of Murau in Styria, Austria. Since the 2015 Styria municipal structural reform, it is part of the municipality Scheifling.

Geography
The municipality lies about 18 km east of Murau.

References

Cities and towns in Murau District